A dragonslayer is a person or being that slays dragons. Dragonslayers and the creatures they hunt have been popular in traditional stories from around the world: they are a type of story classified as type 300 in the Aarne–Thompson classification system. They continue to be popular in modern books, films, video games and other forms of entertainment. Dragonslayer-themed stories are also sometimes seen as having a chaoskampf theme - in which a heroic figure struggles against a monster that epitomises chaos.

Description

A dragonslayer is often the hero in a "Princess and dragon" tale. In this type of story, the dragonslayer kills the dragon in order to rescue a high-class female character, often a princess, from being devoured by it. This female character often then becomes the love interest of the account. One notable example of this kind of legend is the story of Ragnar Loðbrók, who slays a giant serpent, thereby rescuing the maiden, Þóra borgarhjörtr, whom he later marries.

There are, however, several notable exceptions to this common motif. In the legend of Saint George and the Dragon, for example, Saint George overcomes the dragon as part of a plot which ends with the conversion of the dragon's grateful victims to Christianity, rather than Saint George being married to the rescued princess character.

In a Norse legend from the Völsunga saga, the dragonslayer, Sigurd, kills Fafnir - a dwarf who has been turned into a dragon as a result of guarding the cursed ring that had once belonged to the dwarf, Andvari. After slaying the dragon, Sigurd drinks some of the dragon's blood and thereby gains the ability to understand the speech of birds. He also bathes in the dragon's blood, causing his skin to become invulnerable. Sigurd overhears two nearby birds discussing the heinous treachery being planned by his companion, Regin. In response to the plot, Sigurd kills Regin, thereby averting the treachery.

Mythologists such as Joseph Campbell have argued that dragonslayer myths can be seen as a psychological metaphor:
"But as Siegfried [Sigurd] learned, he must then taste the dragon blood, in order to take to himself something of that dragon power. When Siegfried has killed the dragon and tasted the blood, he hears the song of nature. he has transcended his humanity and re-associated himself with the powers of nature, which are powers of our life, and from which our minds remove us.

...Psychologically, the dragon is one's own binding of oneself to one's own ego."

Dragonslayer characters

Antiquity
Enki
Ninurta
Inanna
Marduk
Ra
Teshub
Indra
Baal
El (deity)
Yahweh
Michael
Daniel
Apollo
Zeus
Jupiter
Perseus
Heracles
Saint George
Vahagn
Tarḫunz
Cadmus
Rostam
Fereydun
Garshasp
Yu the Great
Erlang Shen
Li Ji
Eurybarus
Mwindo

Medieval and early Modern legend
Guy of Warwick
Baldr
Beowulf
Sigurd or Siegfried
Dietrich von Bern
Tristan
Margaret the Virgin
Heinrich von Winkelried
Gawain
Dobrynya Nikitich
Skuba Dratewka/Krakus
Drangue
Susanoo
Nezha
Lancelot
Făt-Frumos
Fráech
Bayajidda
Bahrām Gūr
Iovan Iorgovan
Haymon
Wada Heita Tanenaga
John Lambton
Mamadi Sefe Dekote (Africa)
Benzaiten aka Saraswati
Teodosio de Goñi
Piers Shonks
Dieudonné de Gozon

Tolkien's legendarium
Túrin Turambar
Eärendil
Fram
Bard the Bowman

References

Further reading

 Bauman, Richard. "A Sixteenth Century Version of The Dragon-Slayer". In: Fabula vol. 11, no. Jahresband, 1970, pp. 137-143. https://doi-org.wikipedialibrary.idm.oclc.org/10.1515/fabl.1970.11.1.137
 
 d'Huy, Julien. (2013). "Le motif du dragon serait paléolithique: mythologie et archéologie". In: Préhistoire du Sud-Ouest. 21. pp. 195–215.
 d'Huy, Julien. (2014). "Mythologie et statistique. Reconstructions, évolution et origines paléolithiques du combat contre le dragon". In: Mythologie française. pp. 17–23.
 
 Jagiełło, Mieszek (2021). “Thoughts on the Symbolism and Origin of Apollo’s Fight Against the Pythian Snake”. In: Classica Cracoviensia 24 (December): 25-39. https://doi.org/10.12797/CC.24.2021.24.02.

External links
 

Mythological archetypes
 
Fairy tale stock characters